Halarachnidae is a small family of mites in the order Mesostigmata.

Species
Halarachnidae contains seven genera, with ten recognized species:

 Genus Halarachne Allman, 1847
 Halarachne halichoeri Allman, 1847
 Halarachne laysanae Furman & Dailey, 1980
 Genus Orthohalarachne Newell, 1947
 Orthohalarachne attenuata (Banks, 1910)
 Genus Pneumonyssoides Fain, 1955
 Pneumonyssoides caninum (Chandler & Ruhe, 1940)
 Genus Pneumonyssus Banks, 1901
 Pneumonyssus capricorni Domrow, 1974
 Pneumonyssus simicola Banks, 1901
 Genus Rhinophaga Fain, 1955
 Rhinophaga cercopitheci Fain, 1955
 Genus Sciurinyssus
 Sciurinyssus coreaensis
 Genus Zumptiella Fain, 1962
 Zumptiella furmani Fain, 1962
 Zumptiella tamias Fain, Lukoschus & Whitaker, 1983

References

Mesostigmata
Acari families